Pomaderris ledifolia, commonly known as Sydney pomaderris, is a species of flowering plant in the family Rhamnaceae and is endemic to south-eastern continental Australia. It is an erect, delicate shrub with hairy young stems, narrowly elliptic to lance-shaped leaves, and compact clusters of yellow flowers.

Description
The upper surface of the leaves is glabrous and the lower surface is covered with greyish hairs. Flowering occurs from September to November.

Taxonomy
Pomaderris ledifoliawas first formally described in 1825 by Allan Cunningham in Barron Field's Geographical Memoirs on New South Wales. The specific epithet (ledifolia) means "Ledum-leaved".

Distribution and habitat
Sydney pomaderris is widespread on the coast and tablelands of New South Wales where it is usually found on rocky hillsides, but also occurs in south-east Queensland and in the far north-east of Victoria.

References

Flora of New South Wales
ledifolia
Flora of Victoria (Australia)
Flora of Queensland
Plants described in 1825
Taxa named by Allan Cunningham (botanist)